A Puthi (Sylheti: , Perso-Arab: پوتھی), is a book or writing of poetic fairy tales, epics and religious stories of Sylhet and present-day East India, which were read by a senior "educated" person while others would listen. This was used as a medium for education and constructive entertainment.

Terminology

Puthis were manuscripts written in the Sylheti, Bengali or Odia languages, utilising scripts such as the Odia, Sylheti Nagri, Eastern Nagari and Perso-Arabic script. They were mostly used in Bengal, Arakan and East India. Puthi (پوتھی, /po:t̪ʰi:/) is a Sanskrit originated feminine noun which means book.

The pages of puthis could be leaves, leather, sheets of wood, or barks. This was common before the invention of paper. Usually, they were written on one side and bound with a piece of string. This made it resistant to insects as well, allowing it to survive for a long time.

Abdul Karim Sahitya Bisharad collected more than 2,000 puthis. More than 1,000 of them were written by Sylheti Muslims. No other person or organization has collected this number of puthis before.

Script and language
Majority of puthis were written in the Sylheti Nagari script.  There have also been puthis written using Arabic script, even more so in Chittagong and Arakan. The language used when writing was Sylheti, Dobhashi Bengali, a variety of Bengali which lacked tatsama and used Arabic and Persian vocabulary.

See also
Bengali literature

References

Bangladeshi culture
Asian fairy tales
Bengali-language literature